Pterostichus nicaeensis is a species of ground beetle in the subfamily Pterostichinae.

Distribution and habitat
This species is present in the Alps of France and Italy. These beetles can be found under rocks and prefer slightly moist, sandy soil.

References

Pterostichinae
Beetles described in 1835
Beetles of Europe